For other forest zones, see Zona da Mata (coastal) for Brazil, or the African forest zone.

Zona da Mata is a mesoregion of the state of Minas Gerais, Brazil, situated in the southeastern part of the state, along the border of the states of Minas Gerais, Rio de Janeiro and Espírito Santo. The region has a lot of hills, and the heights varies from 100 to 1,900 meters. 
The most important river is the Paraíba do Sul.

Because of its geography it produces one of the best coffees of the region; coming first in 2007 in the annual Brazilian Quality Coffee for Espresso Awards (run by the Italian coffee company Illy).

Zona da Mata was the richest region of Minas Gerais from the 1850s to the 1930s due to coffee and milk production. Today - along with farming - textile, furniture, siderurgy and automotive industries are important to the economy of the region. Some important roads cross the region, like the BR-116, BR-040 and BR-267.

The mesoregion is composed of the following microregions.

 Cataguases
 Juiz de Fora 
 Manhuaçu
 Muriaé
 Ponte Nova 
 Ubá
 Viçosa

The most important and populous city of the region is Juiz de Fora with 500,000 inhabitants, roughly 25% of the Zona da Mata's population. Other important cities are:

 Além Paraíba
 Carangola
 Cataguases
 Leopoldina
 Manhuaçu
 Muriaé
 Ponte Nova
 Santos Dumont
 Ubá
 Viçosa
 Visconde do Rio Branco

Bibliography
"The Forbidden Lands: Colonial Identity, Frontier Violence, and the Persistence of Brazil's Eastern Indians, 1750-1830".  Harold Langfur. Stanford: Stanford University Press, 2006. Paperback, 2009.

External links
 The Zona da Mata
 The historical geographical occupation of the Zona da Mata: on the "Forbidden lands" 
 Cartography and occupartion of the territory: the Zona da Mata in the 18th century and in the first half of the 19th century

References 

Mesoregions of Minas Gerais